Skeet was one of the thirteen shooting events at the 1988 Summer Olympics. Open to both men and women, it was won by Axel Wegner.

Qualification round

DNF Did not finish – Q Qualified for semifinal

Semifinal

EOR Equalled Olympic record – Q Qualified for final

Final

OR Olympic record

References

Sources

Shooting at the 1988 Summer Olympics
1988 Skeet